is a train station located in Kurume, Fukuoka.

Lines 
Nishi-Nippon Railroad
Tenjin Ōmuta Line

Platforms

Adjacent stations

Surrounding area
 Kurume Central Park
 Fukuoka Science Museum
 Kurume Bird Center
 Nankun Elementary School
 Kurume University
 Kurume Castle Ruins
 Kurume City Hall
 Kurumedaiichi Hospital
 Kusu Hospital
 Kurume Higashikushihara Post Office

Railway stations in Fukuoka Prefecture
Railway stations in Japan opened in 1924